Bracknell is a large town and civil parish in Berkshire, England, the westernmost area within the Greater London Urban Area and the administrative centre of the borough of Bracknell Forest.

Originally a market village and part of the Windsor Great Forest, Bracknell experienced a period of huge growth during the mid-20th century when it was declared a new town. Planned at first for a population of 25,000, Bracknell New Town was further expanded in the late 1960s to accommodate a population of 60,000. As part of this expansion, Bracknell absorbed many of the surrounding hamlets including Easthampstead, Ramslade and Old Bracknell. As of 2021, Bracknell Forest has an estimated population of around 113,205 (Census 2021). It is a commercial centre and the UK headquarters for several technology companies.

The town is surrounded by Swinley Forest (up to Winkfield Row) and Crowthorne Woods on the east and south. The urban area has absorbed parts of many local outlying areas including Ascot, Warfield, Winkfield and Binfield.

History

The name Bracknell is first recorded in a Winkfield Boundary Charter of AD 942 as Braccan heal, and may mean "Nook of land belonging to a man called Bracca", from the Old English Braccan (genitive singular of a personal name) + heal, healh (a corner, nook or secret place). An early form of the town's name, Brakenhale, still survives as the name of one of its schools. The town covers all of the old village of Easthampstead (though not all of the old parish) and the hamlet of Ramslade.

There is a Bronze Age round barrow at Bill Hill. Easthampstead Park was a favoured royal hunting lodge in Windsor Forest and Catherine of Aragon was banished there until her divorce was finalised. It was later the home of the Trumbulls who were patrons of Alexander Pope from Binfield.

To the north-east of the town, in the suburb of Quelm Park, is the Quelm Stone, a standing stone, and to the south-west, just over the border in Crowthorne, is Caesar's Camp, an Iron Age hill fort.

One of the oldest buildings in the town is the 'Old Manor' public house, a 17th-century brick manor house featuring a number of priest holes. Next door once stood the 'Hind's Head' coaching inn, where it is said Dick Turpin used to drink. It is believed that there were once tunnels between the two, along which the famous highwayman could escape from the authorities. Other surviving old pubs are the Red Lion and the Bull, both timber-framed and dating from before the 18th century.

The oldest place of worship in the town is the parish church of St Michael and St Mary Magdalene in Easthampstead. There has been a church there since Saxon times, although the present building dates from the mid 19th century, except for the lower portions of the Tudor tower. Holy Trinity Church near the town centre was built in 1851.

New town
Bracknell was designated a new town on 17 June 1949, in the aftermath of the Second World War. The site was originally a village cum small town in the civil parish of Warfield in the Easthampstead Rural District. Very little of the original Bracknell is left. The location was preferred to White Waltham, which was also considered, because the Bracknell site avoided encroaching on good quality agricultural land. It had the additional advantage of being on a railway line.

The existing town centre and industrial areas were to be retained with new industry brought in to provide jobs. The town has since expanded far beyond its intended size into farmland to the south.

The New Town was planned on the neighbourhood principle, with a series of neighbourhoods each with a population of around 10,000 with (no more than around five minutes walk away) a church, a small parade of shops, a primary school, small business space, a community centre and a pub. The plans included pedestrianisation, the construction of a ring road around the town centre, and segregation of industrial areas from residential areas.

A feature of some of the estates is that streets only have names, not odonyms – in Birch Hill, Crown Wood, Great Hollands and others there is no Road, Avenue, Street, just 'Frobisher', 'Jameston', 'Juniper', 'Jevington'. The residential streets are, however, named in alphabetical order in Great Hollands and Wildridings, with As, through Ds, such as Donnybrook, in Hanworth, Js, such as 'Jameston', 'Juniper' and 'Jevington' in Birch Hill.

Regeneration
Because of Bracknell's age, it was decidedby the local authorities that it should undergo renovation. Designs and plans were submitted and rejected first time round. The council went for a second attempt and were accepted, work was due to commence early in 2008 but due to the global credit crisis, the plans were postponed. The cost is estimated at around £750 million. The regeneration will provide brand new services, a completely redeveloped town centre, 1,000 new homes and new police and bus stations.

The Borough Council continues to work in partnership with the Bracknell Regeneration Partnership (comprising Legal and General and Schroder) to regenerate the town centre.

The first stage of the redevelopment began with the opening of a new Waitrose store in December 2011. By June 2013 shops in the northern part of the town in Broadway and Crossway had been vacated. Demolition of the new town's old retro-futuristic, Brutalist central area then began in September 2013, and was completed in December of the same year. Construction of the new centre began in February 2015. On 4 September 2015, it was announced that the new development would be known as The Lexicon. The Lexicon opened on 7 September 2017, comprising  of new retail space, a 12-screen cinema which includes a 4DX screen, restaurants and cafes, completely new paving and public realm and 1300 parking spaces as well as improved access by public transport, the council having substantially refurbished the bus station in 2015.

The scheme won at the Revo Awards 2018: Gold in the Re:new category and Best of the Best in the Re:turn category. Shortlisted for the Planning Awards 2017 in the Regeneration category, the scheme won Development of the Year at the 2018 Thames Valley Property Awards. The town saw visitor numbers of 16m in its first year (compared with around 4-5m prior to the town centre's demolition). The town centre rose in the retail rankings to number 33 (from 255 before redevelopment). In January 2019, the town had risen again to 29 in the retail rankings.

A second retail centre, the Peel Centre, managed by Land Securities,  has 2 car parks, a leisure area called The Point. and includes stores Such as The Range, Sports Direct and New Look. The Point includes an Odeon multiplex 10-screen cinema and a bowling alley.

Bracknell is the first post-war New Town centre to have been substantially regenerated and represents a significant exemplar development.

Demography

According to the Office for National Statistics in 2018 there were 121,676 people in Bracknell Forest.

According to the 2011 Census.

94% of Bracknell residents can speak English. The second language being Nepalese, at 0.90%, followed by Polish at 0.70%, Tagalog/Filipino at 0.30% and French and Spanish, both at 0.30%.

61% of residents identify themselves as Christian. The second most common belief is 'none', with 35% of residents choosing this in the census, in third place is Hinduism at 1.61%, followed by Islam at 1.13% and Buddhism at 0.73%.

The demonym for a person from Bracknell is Bracknellian.

Business

The town is home to companies such as 3M, Panasonic, Egnyte, Fujitsu (formerly ICL), Dell, HP Inc., Hewlett Packard Enterprise, Micron Technology, Brocade Communications Systems, Siemens (originally Nixdorf), Riverbed, Honeywell, Intercall, Broadcom, Avnet Technology Solutions, Novell, Honda and Kleenway, a Royal Warrant holding chimney sweeping company based in Neuman Crescent.

The Southern Industrial Area houses the head office of Waitrose. The  site which houses the Waitrose head office also houses the central distribution centre. Waitrose has operated from the town since the 1970s with its old store based at Birch Hill Shopping Centre until closure with a new store opened in the town centre in 2011.

Manufacturing industry has largely disappeared since the 1980s. Former significant sites included Racal Communications in Western and London Road, Clifford's Dairy in Downshire Way and British Aerospace (originally Sperry Gyroscope) now occupied by Arlington Square, a 22-acre (8 ha) business park of which the first stage was completed in 1995. The Thomas Lawrence brickworks on the north side of the town was famous for 'red rubber' bricks to be found in the Royal Albert Hall and Westminster Cathedral, and in restoration work at 10 Downing Street and Hampton Court Palace.

In the town centre was the 12-storey Winchester House, formerly owned by 3M who moved to new premises in Farley Wood on the town's northern edge in 2004. The building was demolished and has been replaced with a large block of flats The town was also the home of Racal and Ferranti Computer Systems Ltd. The Met Office maintained a large presence in the town until 2003, when it relocated to Exeter in Devon; however, the junction of the A329 and A3095 is still named the "Met Office Roundabout". Many businesses are located on the town's three industrial areas.

Easthampstead Park in the southern suburb of Easthampstead was a conference centre owned by Bracknell Forest Borough Council. In 2019 an agreement was made between the local authority and a hotel group, Active Hospitality. The building is now leased to the company and has reopened as a hotel

Local government
Bracknell was made a civil parish in its own right in 1955. Under the Local Government Act 1972, the entire Easthampstead Rural District became the Bracknell District on 1 April 1974. In 1988, it was granted borough status, and it changed its name to Bracknell Forest. When Berkshire County Council was abolished on 1 April 1998 (and the non-metropolitan county was reclassified as a ceremonial county), Bracknell Forest became one of the six unitary authorities which together make up Berkshire. Bracknell Forest Borough Council's offices are at Time Square in Market Street.

Geography
The town covers areas previously in the parishes of Easthampstead, Warfield, Binfield and Winkfield. The town's centre lies just north of the railway station with completely pedestrianised and much undercover shopping around Princess Square, Charles Square and the Broadway. There are 'out-of-town' shops, a multiscreen cinema and ten pin bowling complex at the Peel Centre. Just to the west are the Western and Southern industrial estates, either side of the railway line. There are many residential suburbs (see settlement table below) of varying dates, the oldest being Priestwood and, of course, Easthampstead village.

The former RAF Staff College buildings in Harmans Water, now closed, was part of the Joint Services Command and Staff College. From 2008, the site was redeveloped for housing by Wimpey, with an estimated 730 houses. The south-western corner of the town remains rural around Easthampstead Park and the wooded Yew Tree Corner. A newer housing development called Jennett's Park was built (from 2007) at Peacock Farm and on part of what was historically the grounds of Easthampstead Park. There are large ponds at Farley Wood and the Easthampstead Mill Pond between Great Hollands and Wildridings, and two lakes at South Hill Park. The Bull Brook emerges above ground just within the bounds of the suburb of Bullbrook.

Culture

In the south of the town is South Hill Park, a mansion dating from 1760, although much rebuilt, that now houses a large arts centre. The Wilde Theatre was opened in 1984, named after Oscar Wilde who created the character 'Lady Bracknell' in his play The Importance of Being Earnest. South Hill Park has been home to a number of major music festivals over the years:

 1975 – 1990s Bracknell Jazz Festival
 1970s – 1980s Bracknell Folk Festival ("The Handsome Mouldiwarp Festival")
 1988 – Womad Festival
 1980s – 1990s – Bracknell Music Festival / South Hill Park Festival
 2000s – 2013 – Big Day Out festival, a free, annual World Music and acoustic/folk festival

Bracknell has been used in the filming of many TV shows and films, such as Harry Potter and the Philosopher's Stone (Martins Heron) and Time Bandits (Birch Hill). Bracknell is given the name 'Laxton' in the TV detective series Pie in the Sky and Waterside Park was used for the exterior of the police HQ in the same series. Bracknell has also featured in the 1991 Roger Daltrey film Buddy's Song.

The Offence (1972), a psychological thriller with Sean Connery and Ian Bannen, was filmed in Bracknell. There are scenes in the town centre, on Broadway, Charles Square and Market Street. The flat for Connery's character was filmed at the listed Point Royal, and the bulk of the outdoor scenes were taken around Wildridings, specifically Arncliffe, Crossfell, Mill Pond and Mill Lane.

The wages snatch scene in Villain (1971), a gangster film with Richard Burton, was filmed in Ellesfield Avenue on the Southern Industrial Estate outside the former Clark Eaton glass factory, with the ICL tower block visible in the background; after the robbery the gang make their getaway along Peacock Lane nearby and hijack a car at the junction with the footpath from Tarmans Copse (now Osprey Avenue on the Jennett's Park estate).

Bracknell is featured in the PlayStation 3 video game Resistance: Fall of Man set in 1951, as the location at which power conduits travel deep underground South East England to power the Chimeran fortresses. It also featured in the sequel Resistance 2 in a similar role.

The BBC show The Wrong Mans is set almost entirely in Bracknell.

Tracy Beaker actress Dani Harmer was brought up in Bracknell.

During the 1960s, author J.M. Coetzee lived in the town and worked for an IT company.

Artist Kerry Lemon was commissioned to create a number of site-specific artworks for the Lexicon town centre development. Her work includes a series of 36 unique botanical paving slabs in granite and brass designed to create a nature trail through the town centre; 15 gobo lights projecting moth drawings in light onto the pavements below; 5 cast jesmonite birch leaf benches with hand sculpted solid brass insects and painted brass leaf veins.

Twinning
Bracknell is twinned with Leverkusen in Germany, an arrangement which has existed since 1973. It was originally twinned with Opladen, which was incorporated into Leverkusen in a 1975 local government reorganisation. Each town has a square named after the other.

Transport

Rail
The town of Bracknell has two railway stations, Bracknell and Martins Heron, both of which are on the Waterloo to Reading Line, built by the London and South Western Railway and now operated by South Western Railway. Bracknell is a commuter centre with its residents travelling in both directions (westwards to Reading and eastwards to London Waterloo).

Road
The town has good road links and is situated at the end of the A329(M) motorway, midway between Junction 3 of the M3 and Junction 10 of the M4 motorways. A proposed motorway link between the M3 and the M4 to be called the M31 would have passed to the west of the town centre, but only the section that is now the A329(M) and the A3290 was built.

Bus
Bracknell bus station serves the town of Bracknell. The bus station is on The Ring in the Town Centre across the road from Bracknell railway station. The bus station consists of three long shelters each with three stands.

Bus services go from Bracknell as far afield as Crowthorne, Camberley, Wokingham, Reading, Maidenhead, Windsor and Slough. Local bus services are provided by Thames Valley Buses and Reading Buses, who also provide the Green Line services to London Victoria and Heathrow Airport.

Air
Green Line operates a bus from Heathrow Airport to Bracknell. Courtney Buses also services this route. 

Sport and leisure
Bracknell Town F.C. are members of the Isthmian League South Central Division, and play their home matches at Larges Lane. The Bracknell Bees Ice Hockey Club are former national champions, who currently play in the NIHL National League. The Bracknell Blazers were the 2009 BBF National League champions. The town is also represented by teams playing rugby, Bracknell RFC; hockey, South Berkshire Hockey Club; and cricket, Bracknell Cricket Club.

The town has a large leisure centre, the Bracknell Leisure Centre, and the Coral Reef Water Park. A golf course, the Downshire Golf Complex. Two tennis Clubs, the Bracknell Lawn Tennis Club and Esporta, the Royal County of Berkshire Club.

A number of organisations are active in the area. These consist of an Army Cadet Force detachment (7 Platoon Bracknell) and the Air Training Corps (2211 Squadron), Saint John Ambulance Cadets and the Bracknell Forest Lions Club, which was formed in 1968 to help those in need.

Education

The area has various schools including St Joseph's Catholic Primary School, The Brakenhale School, Garth Hill College, King's Academy Easthampstead Park and Ranelagh Church of England School. Bracknell and Wokingham College of further education is also based in the area.

Notable people

Dani Harmer (born 8 February 1989) - actress and television personality who starred in The Story of Tracy Beaker

See also
Columbia Centre

References

External links

Bracknell Town Council
Video of portion of town centre before its demolition in 2013, focusing on Crossway House

 
Towns in Berkshire
New towns in England
Civil parishes in Berkshire
New towns started in the 1950s
Bracknell Forest